"Only One You" is a song by Swiss singer-songwriter Luca Hänni. It was released as a digital single on 28 November 2014 by Luca Music. The song peaked at number 56 on the Swiss Singles Chart.

Music video
A music video to accompany the release of "Only One You" was first released onto YouTube on 28 November 2014 at a total length of four minutes and thirty-five seconds.

Charts

Release history

References

2014 singles
2014 songs
Luca Hänni songs